Belp railway station is a railway station in the municipality of Belp, in the Swiss canton of Bern. It is an intermediate stop on the standard gauge Gürbetal line of BLS AG. A bus line links it to Bern Belp Airport.

Services 
The following services stop at Belp:

 Bern S-Bahn:
 : rush-hour service to Biel/Bienne.

Gallery

References

External links 
 
 

Railway stations in the canton of Bern
BLS railway stations